Olja (Olga) Ivanjicki (10 May 1931, in Pančevo – 24 June 2009, in Belgrade) was a Serbian painter, sculptor and poet.

Life, work and awards

Olga Ivanjicki, the daughter of Russian emigrants was born in Pančevo, Danube Banovina. She studied at the Academy of Fine Arts in Belgrade, graduated in 1957, and in the same year she was the only woman among the founders of MEDIALA Belgrade, an art group of painters, writers and architects such as Leonid Šejka, Vladimir Veličković, Ljubomir Popović, Miodrag Đurić. In 1962, she received a scholarship of the Ford Foundation to pursue her art studies in the United States, and in 1978 she was a selected artist of the Fulbright program Artist in Residence at the Rhode Island School of Design.

She had over ninety individual exhibitions and participated in numerous national and international group exhibitions. Ivanjicki’s painting was influenced by Symbolism, Surrealism, Pop art and Fantastic art. In the course of her career, the artist received the Vuk Lifetime Achievement Award (Vukova nagrada, 1988), the Seventh of July Award (Sedmojulska nagrada, 1988) and the Karić Award.

Bibliography (selection)
Večni uslov – poezija (Eternal Condition - Poetry), Novosti, Belgrade 2008, .
Painting the Future, Philip Wilson Publishers, London 2009, .

References

External links
Official Website by Olga Ivanjicki Foundation

1931 births
2009 deaths
20th-century Serbian sculptors
20th-century Serbian poets
20th-century women artists
Artists from Belgrade
Pop artists
Serbian women sculptors
Serbian non-fiction writers
Serbian women painters
Serbian women poets
Serbian women artists
20th-century women writers
Serbian people of Russian descent
20th-century non-fiction writers
Fulbright alumni